The enzyme  peptidylamidoglycolate lyase (EC 4.3.2.5) catalyzes the chemical reaction

[peptide]-(2S)-2-hydroxyglycine = [peptide]-amide + glyoxylate

This enzyme belongs to the family of lyases, specifically amidine lyases.  The systematic name of this enzyme class is [peptide]-(2S)-2-hydroxyglycine peptidyl-amide-lyase (glyoxylate-forming). Other names in common use include α-hydroxyglycine amidating dealkylase, peptidyl-α-hydroxyglycine α-amidating lyase, HGAD, PGL, PAL, and peptidylamidoglycolate peptidylamide-lyase.

References

 

EC 4.3.2
Enzymes of unknown structure